NGC 7503 is an elliptical galaxy in the constellation Pisces. It was discovered by the astronomer Albert Marth on September 2, 1864. It is the brightest galaxy in its cluster (a BCG).

In 2001, SN 2001ic, a type Ia supernova, was detected within NGC 7503.

References

External links 
 

Pisces (constellation)
7503
Elliptical galaxies